The 1927 PGA Championship was the 10th PGA Championship, held from October 31 to November 5 in Texas at Cedar Crest Country Club in Dallas. Then a match play championship, Walter Hagen defeated Joe Turnesa 1 up in the finals to win his fourth consecutive PGA Championship, his fifth and final overall, and the ninth of his eleven major titles.

With his fourth consecutive title, his winning streak stood at twenty matches. Hagen, age 34, was also the medalist in the 36-hole qualifier on Monday at 141 (−1).

The course, south of downtown Dallas, was designed by A. W. Tillinghast and opened in 1919. It hosted the Dallas Open less than two years earlier in January 1926, won by Macdonald Smith. The country club closed in 1929 and the course was purchased by the City of Dallas in 1946 and it continues as a public facility.

At the time, this was the furthest west and south that a major championship had been held. The western limit had been Illinois for multiple majors, and the southernmost venues had been Indiana for the PGA Championship in 1924 and Maryland for the U.S. Open in 1921. Two years later in 1929, the PGA Championship was played in Los Angeles, California.

Format
The match play format at the PGA Championship in 1927 called for 12 rounds (216 holes) in six days:
 Monday – 36-hole stroke play qualifier
top 32 professionals advanced to match play
 Tuesday – first round – 36 holes 
 Wednesday – second round – 36 holes 
 Thursday – quarterfinals – 36 holes 
 Friday – semifinals – 36 holes 
 Saturday – final – 36 holes

Final results
Saturday, November 5, 1927

Final eight bracket

References

External links
PGA Media Guide 2012
PGA.com – 1927 PGA Championship
Cedar Crest Golf Course

PGA Championship
Golf in Texas
Sports competitions in Dallas
PGA Championship
PGA Championship
PGA Championship
PGA Championship
PGA Championship